The 1997 Omaha mayoral election was held on May 13, 1997. It saw the reelection of incumbent mayor Hal Daub.

Election results

Primary
The primary was held April 1, 1997.

General

References

Omaha
1997 Nebraska elections
1997